Brťov-Jeneč is a municipality in Blansko District in the South Moravian Region of the Czech Republic. It has about 300 inhabitants.

Administrative parts
The municipality is made up of villages of Brťov u Černé Hory and Jeneč.

References

Villages in Blansko District